Saint-Jean-de-Losne (literally Saint John of Losne) is a commune in the Côte-d'Or department in eastern France.

History

Despite its size, the town's position on the Saône River meant it featured in a number of battles. In October 1636, during the Thirty Years War, the fortress was besieged by an Imperial army; the garrison commander, Mothe-Houdancourt, held out long enough to be relieved.

During the closing stages of the Napoleonic Wars in January 1814, the local inhabitants repelled several attempts by the Austrians to seize the bridge. In recognition, Napoleon awarded the town the Legion of Honour, which still appears on the coat of arms.

Population

See also
 Canal de Bourgogne
 Communes of the Côte-d'Or department

References

Sources
 

Communes of Côte-d'Or